Słupsko  is a village in the administrative district of Gmina Rudziniec, within Gliwice County, Silesian Voivodeship, in southern Poland. The village has a population of 411.

The village was mentioned in a Latin document of Diocese of Wrocław called Liber fundationis episcopatus Vratislaviensis from around 1305 as Slubzhec solvitur decima more polonico.

References

Villages in Gliwice County